Błędowa may refer to the following places in Poland:

Błędowa Tyczyńska
Błędowa Zgłobieńska